Lisa Raymond and Samantha Stosur were the defending champions, but Vania King and Nadia Petrova defeated them 6–1, 6–4, in the final.

Seeds

  Katarina Srebotnik /  Ai Sugiyama (first round)
  Lisa Raymond /  Samantha Stosur (final)
  Casey Dellacqua /  Francesca Schiavone (semifinals)
  Chia-jung Chuang /  Su-wei Hsieh (semifinals)

Draw

Draw

External links
 *Tokyo Draws

Pan Pacific Open
Toray Pan Pacific Open
2008 Toray Pan Pacific Open